Silvia, or Sylvia, (c. 515 – c. 592) was the mother of Gregory the Great. She is venerated as a saint by the Catholic Church and Eastern Orthodox Church, which names her a patroness of pregnant women.

Life
Little biographical information about her exists.  Her native place is sometimes given as Sicily, sometimes as Rome. Apparently she was of a distinguished family as her husband, the Roman regionarius, Gordianus. She had, besides Gregory, a second son, whose name did not survive through the ages.

Silvia was noted for her great piety, and she gave her sons an excellent education. After the death of her husband, around 573, she devoted herself entirely to religion in the "new cell by the gate of blessed Paul" (cella nova juxta portam beati Pauli). Gregory the Great had a mosaic portrait of his parents executed at the monastery of Saint Andrew; it is minutely described by Johannes Diaconus.

Veneration

The veneration of Silvia is of early date. She was honoured by the Romans as a type of a Christian widow. Silvia had built a chapel in her house. In 645, the monks from the monastery of Mar Saba (Palestine) settled in this house, and devoted it to the celebration of Saint Sabas. 

Pope Clement VIII (1592–1605) inserted her name under 3 November in the Roman Martyrology. She is invoked by pregnant women for a safe delivery.

Two of her relatives, sisters-in-law Trasilla and Emiliana, are also venerated as saints, as well as her other sister-in-law Gordiana, and her husband Gordianus.

References

External links

 Santa Silvia

515 births
592 deaths
6th-century Italo-Roman people
6th-century Byzantine people
6th-century Christian saints
Italian Roman Catholic saints
Female saints of medieval Italy
6th-century Italian women
Pope Gregory I
Medieval Italian saints